In Sweden, the area codes are, including the leading 0, two, three or four digits long, with larger towns and cities having shorter area codes permitting a larger number of telephone numbers in the eight to ten digits used (including the leading '0'). Before the 1990s, ten-digit numbers were very rare, but they have become increasingly common because of the deregulation of telecommunications, the new 112 emergency number (which required change of all numbers starting with 11), and the creation of a single area code for the Greater Stockholm area. No subscriber number is shorter than five digits. The longest subscriber numbers have eight digits (only in the Stockholm area).

History
The first automatic telephony in Sweden was operating in 1924 within a small area in Stockholm. Area codes were introduced around 1935 for usage in automatic national telephony. 330 areas with three or four digits were allocated with 010 for Stockholm, and maximum nine digits in total as a technical limit. In order to allow more numbers including seven digit local numbers in Stockholm, in 1964 Stockholm changed from 010 to 08. Automatic international calls were introduced in 1965 with the prefix 009, changed to 00 in 1999. In 1992 all area codes beginning with 07 were allocated as 08 plus eight digits (the nine digits technical limit was then bypassed), and 07 was allocated for wireless applications such as mobile phones. Analog mobile phones had been using 010.

Area codes

Special numbers

Sweden adopted 00 as its international access code in 1999 replacing 009, 007 and 008x. Carrier pre-selection was introduced at the same time.

According to the postal and telecommunication services supervising authority Post- och Telestyrelsen, it seems possible that Sweden will adopt a closed numbering plan in the future.

References

External links 
Swedish Posts and Telecom Authority – Ministry responsible for telecommunications in Sweden.

 
Sweden
Telephone numbeukujuuors